The Grafeneck Euthanasia Centre housed in Grafeneck Castle was one of Nazi Germany's killing centres as part of their forced euthanasia programme. Today, it is a memorial site dedicated to the victims of the state-authorised programme also referred to since as Action T4.
At least 10,500 mentally and physically disabled people, predominantly from Bavaria and Baden-Württemberg, were systematically killed during 1940. It was one of the first places in Nazi Germany where people were killed in large numbers in a gas chamber using carbon monoxide. This was the beginning of the Euthanasia Programme.

Location
Grafeneck is a castle-like property in Grafeneck, a part of the municipality of Gomadingen in Baden-Württemberg.

History
Built around 1560, the Grafeneck Castle served as a hunting lodge for the Dukes of Württemberg. In the 19th century, it was used by the Forest Service. The Samaritan Foundation charity acquired it in 1928, and established an asylum for disabled people in the following year. On 13 October 1939 Richard Alber, Landrat of administrative district Münsingen from 1938 to 1944, ordered that Schloss Grafeneck had to be cleared the next day. Four buses evacuated around 100 disabled men and a few women from Grafeneck, as well as 12 employees, to the St. Elizabeth Monastery in Reute. All of these evacuated patients survived Aktion T4.

Modification of the building
From October 1939 to January 1940 the former Samaritan Hospital was rebuilt into a killing area.
Living and administration rooms were installed in the castle, as well as a registry office and a police office. 
In the castle grounds were built a wooden hut with about 100 beds, a parking space for the grey buses, a crematorium oven and a shed with facilities for gassing people. 
Moreover, staff were recruited from Stuttgart and Berlin: doctors, police officers, clerks, maintenance and transport personnel, economic and domestic staff, guards and funeral staff. Between October and December 1939, only 10 to 20 people were in the castle, but by 1940 there were about 100 staff.

Systematic murder under Action T4 started on 18 January 1940 in Grafeneck in a gas chamber camouflaged as a shower room, which was in a garage. The prison doctor operated a manometer valve to allow carbon monoxide to enter the gas chamber. The steel cylinders required were supplied by Mannesmann; the gas was made by IG Farben in Ludwigshafen (BASF). The first murdered patients were from the mental hospital Eglfing-Haar in Bavaria. The victims came from 48 institutions for the handicapped and mentally ill: 40 from almost all districts of Baden-Württemberg, six from Bavaria and one each from Hesse and North Rhine-Westphalia.

Killings with gas were performed between January and December 1940.  On 13 December 1940 the last victims were burned in the crematory.
Afterwards, Grafeneck was used to house children and mothers with babies who had fled from Allied bombing. 10,654 disabled and sick people were killed in Grafeneck Castle through lethal injections and gas. In the 1950s, the development of the cemetery began as a memorial. In 2005, the documentation centre Grafeneck Memorial was built.

Documentation Centre Grafeneck
The Grafeneck process presented in the summer of 1949, a total of 10,654 victims laid.

Offenders
Some Grafeneck staff later held important positions in the Nazi concentration camps.

Administration

 Ludwig Sprauer, (1884-1962), highest medical officer of Baden, responsible for implementation of "Euthanasie-Programm" in Baden. 
 Otto Mauthe, (1892-1974), highest medical officer of Württemberg, responsible for "Euthanasie"-administration in Württemberg.
 Eugen Stähle, (1890-1948), medical officer in the Württemberg ministry of the interior.

Doctors
The T4-organisators Viktor Brack and Karl Brandt arranged that the killing of ill people was to be made only by medical staff, according to a letter from Adolf Hitler (1. September). Operating the gas tap was the task of the doctors. However, the gas tap was operated by non-medical staff when the doctors were not present or for other reasons.  Grafeneck doctors were referred to in correspondence using code names, shown here in quotation marks.

Head, "medical director": Horst Schumann (1906-1983), ("Dr Klein"), from January 1940 to the end of May/beginning of June 1940. Afterward worked at Sonnenstein Euthanasia Centre and as a camp doctor in Auschwitz-Birkenau.
Deputy: Ernst Tree Hard (1911-1943) ("Dr Hunter"): from January 1940 to April 1940. From December 1940 to June 1941 held the same position in the Hadamar Euthanasia Centre.
Deputy: Günther Hennecke (1912-1943) ("Dr Fleck"), from 25 April 1940 to December 1940.  Afterward held the same position in the Hadamar Euthanasia Centre.

Management and other personnel
"Office manager": Christian Wirth, the most important non-medical director of the killing center, responsible for security; the Special Registry Office Grafeneck; forging the official death certificates; the staff; and supervising murder operations.
Deputy "office manager": Gerhard Kurt Simon ("Dr. Ott", "wedge"); Drawing as a "registrar" ("anger") . 
First director of the Special Registry Office Grafeneck: Jakob Wöger ("Haase"), from December 1939 to June 1940.
Deputy Head of the Special Registry Office: Hermann Holzschuh, according to Wögers leaving his successor ("Lemm") 
"Burner": Josef Oberhauser, responsible for burning bodies in the specially installed cremators.
"Transport manager": Hermann Schwenninger, headed the transport squadron of "Gekrat", which brought the victims to Grafeneck.

Literature 

 Susanne C. Knittel, The Historical Uncanny: Disability, Ethnicity, and the Politics of Holocaust Memory, (New York: Fordham University Press, 2015). 
Ernst Klee: "Euthanasie" im NS-Staat. Die "Vernichtung lebensunwerten Lebens". S. Fischer Verlag, Frankfurt am Main 1983, . – Standardwerk bis heute mit vielen Informationen über Grafeneck.
 Karl Morlok: Wo bringt ihr uns hin? Geheime Reichssache Grafeneck, Stuttgart 1985. – Erste kleine Monographie.
 
 Klaus-Peter Drechsel: Beurteilt Vermessen Ermordet. Praxis der Euthanasie bis zum Ende des deutschen Faschismus. Duisburg 1993, .
 Roland Müller u. a.: Krankenmord im Nationalsozialismus – Grafeneck und die "Euthanasie" in Südwestdeutschland. Stuttgart: Archiv der Stadt Stuttgart, Hohenheim Verlag. 2001. 150 Seiten, .
 Henry Friedlander: The Origins of Nazi Genocide: From Euthanasia to the Final Solution. Chapel Hill: University of North Carolina Press, 1995.
 Thomas Stöckle: Grafeneck 1940. Die Euthanasie-Verbrechen in Südwestdeutschland, 3. Auflage Tübingen 2012, Silberburg-Verlag, 
 Jörg Kinzig, Thomas Stöckle (Hrsg.): 60 Jahre Tübinger Grafeneck-Prozess: Betrachtungen aus historischer, juristischer, medizinethischer und publizistischer Perspektive. Verlag Psychiatrie und Geschichte, Zwiefalten 2011; 
 Henning Tümmers: Justitia und die Krankenmorde: Der "Grafeneck-Prozess" in Tübingen. In: Stefanie Westermann, Richard Kühl, Tim Ohnhäuser (Ed.): NS-"Euthanasie" und Erinnerung: Vergangenheitsaufarbeitung – Gedenkformen – Betroffenenperspektiven. Medizin und Nationalsozialismus 3, LIT Verlag, Münster 2011, S. 95–122; 
 Werner Blesch, Konrad Kaiser u. a.: Uns wollen sie auf die Seite schaffen. Deportation und Ermordung von 262 behinderten Menschen der Johannesanstalten Mosbach und Schwarzach in den Jahren 1940 und 1944 In: Mosbach im Dritten Reich. Heft 2, Mosbach 1993. 
 Hans-Werner Scheuing: "…als Menschenleben gegen Sachwerte gewogen wurden." Die Anstalt Mosbach im Dritten Reich und die Euthanasie-Diskussion heute. 2. Auflage. Universitätsverlag Winter, Heidelberg 2004, . 
 Franka Rößner: Opfer staatlicher Gewalt – Gedenkstättenarbeit am Beispiel Grafeneck.  In: Siegfried Frech/Frank Meier (Hrsg): Unterrichtsthema Staat und Gewalt. Kategoriale Zugänge und historische Beispiele. Wochenschau-Verlag, Schwalbach am Taunus 2012, S. 117–137.
 Müller, Thomas; Kanis-Seyfried, Uta; Reichelt, Bernd; Schepker, Renate (Ed.): Psychiatrie in Oberschwaben. Die Weissenau zwischen Versorgungsfunktion und universitärer Forschung. Zwiefalten 2017.
 Müller, Thomas; Schmidt-Michel, Paul-Otto; Schwarzbauer, Franz (Hg.): Vergangen? Spurensuche und Erinnerungsarbeit – Das Denkmal der grauen Busse. Zwiefalten 2017.
 Mueller, Thomas and Reichelt, Bernd: The ‘Poitrot Report’, 1945. The first public document on Nazi Euthanasia. History of Psychiatry, London, 2019, DOI: https://doi.org/10.1177/0957154X19842017.
 Mueller, Thomas: "Remembering psychiatric patients in Germany murdered by the Nazi regime." The Lancet – Psychiatry. Vol. 5, Issue 10, Oct. 2018, pp. 789–790 (plus web appendix).
 Schmidt-Michel, Paul-Otto; Müller, Thomas: "Der Umgang mit Angehörigen der Opfer der "Aktion T 4" durch die NS-Behörden und die Anstalten in Württemberg." Psychiatrische Praxis 45 (2018) S. 126-132.

References

External links

grafeneck.finalnet.de/ (in German)
  mit Zeittafel, Fotos und weiterführenden Literaturhinweisen
 "Die Wege zur ‚Euthanasie‘ im NS-Staat und ihre Verwirklichung in der Tötungsanstalt Grafeneck", Anna Ketterer, PH Reutlingen, Seminararbeit, WS 2004/2005, pdf-Datei, 42 S.
 "Tötung in einer Minute." Quellen zur Euthanasie im Staatsarchiv Ludwigsburg, virtual exhibition
 Files of the so-called Grafeneck-Process to "Euthanasia" before the court of Tübingen 1949 as digital reproduction Online-offer Staatsarchiv Sigmaringen
 Final station Grafeneck – "Euthanasia" at Grafeneck castle 1940
 2009 – 70 years after euthanasia murders in Grafeneck: "trace of rememerance" A colour track between the place of the victims and the offenders in the ministry of the interior in Stuttgart.
 Übersicht der deutschen Gedenkstätten, ns-gedenkstaetten.de

 Projekt: Gedenken an Anna, Plan, Fotoserie von heute u. a.
 The grey busses a journey to the uncertain 

Aktion T4 euthanasia centres
Nazi eugenics
World War II memorials in Germany
Monuments and memorials to the victims of Nazism
Museums in Baden-Württemberg
World War II museums in Germany